Na Jung-woong (born 31 October 1992) is a South Korean tennis player.

Career
Na has a career high ATP singles ranking of 404 achieved on 16 September 2013. He also has a career high ATP doubles ranking of 966, achieved on 19 May 2014. He represents South Korea at the Davis Cup, where he has a W/L record of 0–1.

Challengers and Futures finals

Singles (1–5)

Doubles (0–1)

External links

1992 births
Living people
South Korean male tennis players
21st-century South Korean people